Minaret Kabir (Menār-e Kabir) was an eleventh century brick minaret, located in Tabas (a desert city in central Iran), constructed during the Seljuk Empire.

The minaret was one of the earliest recorded man-made structures in Tabas, constructed between 993 and 1014 (during the late Ghaznavid-early Seljuk period).

It collapsed on 22 February 1907, due to the construction of the Kariz-e Allahabad, a qanat, which weakened the minaret's foundations.
 
The minaret was recorded as one of Iran's National Heritage on 7 December 1935 (Archeological Department Registration No. 245).

The remnants of the minaret were removed in the 1960s and bricks from it have been found in the walls of surrounding houses.

See also 
 Cultural Heritage, Handicrafts and Tourism Organization of Iran
 Seljuq dynasty

References

External links 
 

 
Architecture in Iran
Islamic architecture
Islamic art
Seljuk architecture